A referendum on extending the parliamentary mandate was held in Morocco on 1 December 1989. As elections had been held in 1984, the six-year term for Parliament due to expire in 1990. The decision was approved by 100% of voters, with a 98.8% turnout.

Following a constitutional referendum in 1992, elections were held in 1993.

Results

References

1989 referendums
Referendums in Morocco
1989 in Morocco
Constitutional referendums in Morocco